The B&R 23 is a sailing boat designed in the early 1990s. It has an ultralight construction with a very large sail plane. Typical crew is a helmsman and two deck hands in trapezes. The boat is predominantly used for racing.

History 
B&R 23 was designed by Lars Bergström, Sven-Olov Ridder and Torkel Stillefors.

The idea came from Stillefors, who had been involved in the sail racing circles of New Zealand while living there in the early 1980s. During his time in New Zealand, Stillefors was inspired by the high performance extreme dinghies and ultra light displacement sport boats there.  In addition, the 18ft skiffs in Sydney Harbour were a source of inspiration, and soon Stillefors started contemplate building something similar that could offer similar performance and thrills.

Back in Sweden Stillefors got in contact with Lars Bergström and Sven-Olof Ridder, at the time a famous Swedish inventor/design duo, who became interested in Stillefors’ ideas for a new high performance sportsboat. This led them to taking part in the design of a new boat, the B&R 23.

Bergström designed the hull and sail plan at his design office in Sarasota Florida, resulting in a computer printed line drawing, a design technique that was not common practice in those early days of computer-aided design.

Ridder focused on the design of the hydrodynamic detail. Ridder, working as Professor at the Royal Institute of Technology in Stockholm, had previously built scaled models, very similar to the B&R 23, and performed dynamic tank testing on them to verify the hydrodynamic characteristics of the design. At his residence in Stockholm he designed the 32-degree swept back retractable keel and the rudder.

Stillefors took charge of the superstructure, deck layout and equipment design.

In 1993 the first B&R 23 was built at Bergsviksvarvet in Stockholm by Stillefors, and soon the sailors on Lake Mälaren saw a futuristic fast boat with two deck hands on wire swishing past them with water spraying around the bow.

Design philosophy 
The B&R 23 is designed with a single guiding principle: it should be very fast.

No considerations were given to any performance limiting handicap or yardstick rules, or other secondary parameters, such as comfort or ease-of-handling. Thus, the philosophy behind B&R 23’s design can be said having been “no-holds-barred”, that is, a ruthless focus on raw performance.

This resulted in an extremely light (420 kg/926 lbs), minimum resistance, high performance apparent wind boat with a huge sail plane, particularly for downwind, where the total sail area is close to 100 m2 (1,000 sqft).  The boat is capable of planing in modest winds downwind, and even on upwind the boat performs very well, in parity with much bigger 38–40 foot yachts.

For the hull, Bergström was strongly influenced by Hunter’s Child, an Open 60 ultra light weight design, which was built in the early 1990s and raced in the 1994-1995 BOC Challenge.

The B&R 23 is equipped with the patented B&R rig. The main characteristics of the rig include:
 two rigid struts supporting the lower section of the mast
 no backstays
 30 degree swept spreaders
 double diamond shrouding

Benefits of the B&R rig are:
 decreased load of mast foot - load spread over three points, allows for smaller mast section, decreasing weight
 increased strength of rig
 the loading of the mast, shrouds and mast foot is decreased
 allows for a large leach in mainsail

The B&R 23 sports a 5 ft rotating bowsprit which allows the asymmetrical spinnakerto  be rotated laterally 30 degrees to windward, to avoid blanketing by the jib when sailing deeper angles. It also features a system with two trapezes to maximize the righting moment that the crew can assert on the boat to keep it level. The retractable keel is operated with a tackle attached to the mast.

The most recently built boat is equipped with a deeper and heavier keel (for even better upwind performance) and a carbon fiber mast (to lower center of gravity). The first generation of boats can be retrofitted with these improvements.

Characteristics 
The  boat has almost no form stability: walking on the gunwale, the boat immediately heels over. There is not much weight stability either, the 90 kg’s of the ‘keel’ does not provide enough momentum to keep the boat upright, even without any wind pressure in the sail plane. In this respect the boat is much more of a dinghy than a keel boat. On water under sail, the boat must be kept upright by active crew work, balancing, hiking, steering and constant adjustment of the power of the sails.

The B&R 23 is very agile, reacting immediately to the tiniest changes in conditions, demanding a high level of alertness and very proactive sailing by the crew, who must be fully synchronised in all their actions on board.  Upwind, the boat is able to plane under ideal conditions, however, the best point of sail for a B&R 23 is downwind. Being an apparent wind boat, it will rarely if ever be sailed directly downwind, instead, optimum downwind performance is achieved by gybing downwind while reaching somewhere around 150 degrees TWA, which typically results in AWA’s forward of beam. In most conditions, boat speed will easily exceed wind speed, and in favorable conditions, getting close to factor 2.

As soon as the wind exceeds light breeze, the boat must be steered for balance by agile crew work and tiller work by the helmsman. It is not possible to ‘force’ the boat doing anything it doesn’t want to. In a moderate breeze, under downwind, there must always be room to bear off  - should a gust suddenly hit, the only option to keep the boat from capsizing is to bear off. This makes overtaking close to windward of another boat interesting.

The very large sail area demands constant control of the power generated by the sails. As soon as the breeze increases, wind must be spilled to maintain balance. The B&R 23 is kept upright and steered not only by rudder, but by the combination of TWA, balancing, sail trim as well as rudder.

The performance of the boat is exceptional as attested by the Life on the Layline Action Index. The B&R 23 scores very high, close to the most extreme multihulls.

References

External links
Torkel Båtar B&R 23, Manufacturer's specifications
Another New Approach to Cruising Sailboats, Lars Bergström, B&R Designs
Torkel Blogg B&R 23 Torkel blogg B&R 23

Keelboats